Temo or Têmo may refer to
 Temo (river), a river in Sardinia
 Têmo, a village in Tibet